Ogre Tones is the eleventh full-length studio album by American rock band King's X. Released in 2005, it is their first record on the Inside Out Music label.

Reception
Greg Prato of AllMusic gave the album 3.5 stars of 5, saying that "While there are a few catchy tunes — especially the album opener, 'Alone' — for the most part, riffs 'n' ranting play a prominent role here." He added, "Not all of the lyrics hit the mark," citing a line from the song "Bebop" which apparently quotes "Tutti Frutti," by Little Richard.

Track listing

Personnel
Doug Pinnick - bass, lead vocals
Ty Tabor - guitar, vocals
Jerry Gaskill - drums, vocals

Production
 Produced and mixed by Michael Wagener for Double Trouble Productions, Inc.
 Mastered at Alien Beans Studios by Ty Tabor
 Ryu Tashiro, assistant and additional engineering
 CD package design and illustration by Jeff Wood

Charts

References

External links
Official website

2005 albums
King's X albums
Albums produced by Michael Wagener
Inside Out Music albums